The Amazing Kamikaze Syndrome is the eleventh studio album by the British rock group Slade. It was released on 3 December 1983 and reached No. 49 in the UK charts. The album was produced largely by bassist Jim Lea. The two UK Top 10 singles released from the album, "My Oh My" and "Run Runaway", were produced by John Punter.

In 1984, the album was re-packaged and released as Keep Your Hands Off My Power Supply by CBS Associated records in the United States and Canada. Both "Run Runaway" and "My Oh My" were US Top 40 hits that year, giving the band their long-awaited breakthrough there.

Background
Following Slade's performance at the Reading festival in 1980, interest in the band was revived and a major record deal with RCA signed. The Amazing Kamikaze Syndrome was the band's second studio album for the label and had mostly been recorded in 1982. In November that year, the album's first single, "(And Now the Waltz) C'est La Vie", was released and reached No. 50 in the UK. However, in early 1983, RCA felt the recorded tracks for the album lacked potential chart hits and in the effort to amend that, RCA suggested the band work with producer John Punter. Lead vocalist Noddy Holder and Lea then wrote and demoed two songs; "My Oh My" and "Run Runaway". Both were received with enthusiasm by RCA and Punter was hired to work on the two tracks.

Released in November 1983, "My Oh My" became a UK No. 2 hit over the Christmas period. The success of the single led to RCA rush-releasing The Amazing Kamikaze Syndrome in December, rather than February 1984. The album reached No. 49 in the UK and was a success across Europe. In January 1984, the second single "Run Runaway" reached No. 7. The success of Quiet Riot's version of "Cum on Feel the Noize" in late 1983 led to Slade signing with CBS, who would repackage The Amazing Kamikaze Syndrome into Keep Your Hands Off My Power Supply in 1984.

The album's title was suggested by Holder. In a 1983 interview, he revealed:

Release
In a 1986 fan club interview, Holder spoke of the band's wish that a follow-up single from the album had been released following "Run Runaway". He said: "We all felt that there should have been a single out on the back of "Run Runaway". The album was our first big success in America, it was Top 5 all over Europe and Number 1 in Scandinavia for months. Britain was the only place it wasn't a big album. We could have, theoretically, had another single off it. It would have been a hit. There was plenty of good stuff on that album."

Promotion
During the album's release in December, the band had already embarked on a UK college tour. With the success of "My Oh My", the band were also appearing on UK and European TV regularly, followed by the success of "Run Runaway". As the album was originally to be released in February 1984, plans for a major concert tour had been discussed. However, the tour never took place and after a few concerts in America during 1984, the band would never perform live again, except for a one-song performance at the band's 25th Anniversary party, organised by the fan club.

Critical reception

Upon release, Kerrang! felt the album showed an "apparently effortless confidence and an untainted infectiousness". They concluded: "Slade have lost none of their old wicked touch." Sounds commented that the album "shows conclusively that Slade are still capable of rocking harder and catchier than most bands half their age." They added: "They sound so lively and confident you can forgive them the rock 'n' roll clichés they occasionally slip into. As always it's the hell-raisin' metal-boogie stomps that really shake the timbers, and there's enough big stampers here to keep Quiet Riot in hits till 1987!" Record Mirror described the album as "Slade's ultimate celebration", adding "it's no nonsense stuff to leave you with a throb in your pinkies and a wide smile. Breathtaking entertainment guaranteed."

Anne Lambert of Number One commented: "Slade still carry the same sound – enormous distorted guitars topped by Noddy belting it out for dear life. It will be cherished by Slade fanatics, and tolerated by everyone else." Linda Duff of Smash Hits said: "On which Four Lads set out to make as big a racket as possible. And with drums that sound like sacks of hobnail boots being chucked down long stairways, violin solos that career dangerously in and out of tune plus steamy guitars that tend to race along, they succeed very well. I wouldn't contemplate life by it, but it's a laff, inn'it?"

Joe Geesin of the webzine Get Ready to Rock! retrospectively wrote: "The Amazing Kamikaze Syndrome kicks off proving that while it wasn't the classic Slade of old, they still had it. The riffs were still big, and the solos were if anything better, more metal if commercial metal." Jeff Giles of Ultimate Classic Rock described the album as a "well-written and smartly polished set of songs that topped off the band's rock sound with pop production perfectly in step with current trends."

Track listing

Song information
"Slam the Hammer Down" would be released in America as a promotional single in 1984, remixed by Shep Pettibone. In "Cocky Rock Boys (Rule O.K.)", the line "you Frank and Johnny, you're hurting my arm" is heard at the end of the song, which is a reference to the 1941 film The Maltese Falcon, starring Humphrey Bogart. "Ready to Explode" is an eight-and-half-minute, multi-themed song about the excitement of motor racing.

Chart performance

Personnel
Slade
Noddy Holder – lead vocals, rhythm guitar
Dave Hill – lead guitar, backing vocals
Jim Lea – bass, keyboards, guitars, backing vocals, lead vocal on verses (track 7), producer
Don Powell – drums, percussion, gongs

Additional personnel
Andy Dummit – saxophone (track 2)
Pete Drummond – announcements (track 7)
John Punter – producer (tracks 3, 5)
Andy Miller, Dave Garland – engineers (tracks 1–2, 4, 6–10)
Mike Nocito, Pete Schwier – engineers (tracks 3, 5)
Andrew Christian – art direction
Shoot That Tiger! – design
John Shaw – photography
Phil Davis – set designer

References

Slade albums
1983 albums
Albums produced by John Punter
Albums produced by Jim Lea
RCA Records albums